Vellingshøj railway station is a railway station serving the district of Højene in the northern part of the town of Hjørring in Vendsyssel, Denmark.

Vellingshøj station is located on the Hirtshals Line between Hirtshals and Hjørring. The station opened in 1925. The train services are currently operated by Nordjyske Jernbaner which run frequent local train services between Hirtshals and Hjørring with onward connections from Hjørring to the rest of Denmark.

History 
The station opened in 1925 when the railway started. The station was closed in 1931 but continues as a halt.

Operations 
The train services are currently operated by Nordjyske Jernbaner which run frequent local train services between Hirtshals and Hjørring with onward connections from Hjørring to the rest of Denmark.

References

Notes

Bibliography

External links

 Nordjyske Jernbaner – Danish railway company operating in North Jutland Region
 Danske Jernbaner – website with information on railway history in Denmark
 Nordjyllands Jernbaner – website with information on railway history in North Jutland

Hjørring
Railway stations in the North Jutland Region
Railway stations opened in 1925
Sylvius Knutzen railway stations
Railway stations in Denmark opened in the 20th century